The 1986 European Weightlifting Championships were held in Karl-Marx-Stadt, East Germany from May 6 to May 11, 1986. This was the 65th edition of the event. There were 127 men in action from 22 nations.

Medal summary

Medal table
Ranking by Big (Total result) medals

References
Results (Chidlovski.net)
Панорама спортивного года 1986 / Сост. В. М. Андрианов — М.: Физкультура и спорт, 1987. 

European Weightlifting Championships
European Weightlifting Championships
European Weightlifting Championships
International weightlifting competitions hosted by Germany
Sport in Chemnitz